Leonardo Casanova Díaz (born February 6, 1985) is a Mexican football manager and former player. He was born in Tuxtla Gutiérrez. He is the brother of the professional football player, Miguel Ángel Casanova.

During his career as a professional footballer, he played on the teams Jaguares de Tapachula, Petroleros de Salamanca, Irapuato and Cruz Azul Hidalgo.

In 2015, Casanova was appointed as CEO of Cafetaleros de Tapachula. On February 25, 2020, he was appointed as new Cafetaleros de Chiapas manager.

References

Living people
1985 births
Association football defenders
Salamanca F.C. footballers
Chiapas F.C. footballers
Irapuato F.C. footballers
Liga MX players
Ascenso MX players
Liga Premier de México players
Mexican football managers
Footballers from Chiapas
Mexican footballers
People from Tuxtla Gutiérrez